Charles Linglet (born June 22, 1982) is a Canadian-Belarusian professional ice hockey Forward who last played for the Cardiff Devils of the Elite Ice Hockey League (EIHL).

Playing career
After having spent time with various AHL and ECHL teams, Linglet made his debut in the National Hockey League (NHL) for the Edmonton Oilers in a game against the Dallas Stars on April 2, 2010.

Linglet spent most of the 2009–10 season playing for the Springfield Falcons of the American Hockey League (AHL). He finished the season with 74 points in 75 games, and was named to the AHL's Second All-Star Team.

In 2010, he moved to the KHL, joining Torpedo Nizhny Novgorod. After one year with the Torpedo team, he was signed by HC Dinamo Minsk prior to the 2011-12 campaign.

On February 26, 2013, Linglet accepted Belarusian citizenship. During the 2012–13 season, Linglet left HC Dinamo Minsk and completed the season in Switzerland with HC Lugano of the National League A.

On May 29, 2013, Linglet agreed a return to the KHL, signing a one-year deal with Croatian club, KHL Medveščak Zagreb. In May 2014, he moved back to Dinamo Minsk, where he played until November 2016, followed by a short stint at Finnish Liiga side Tappara.

On January 31, 2017, he was signed by Eisbären Berlin of the German DEL.

In 2018, Linglet moved to the UK to sign for EIHL side Cardiff Devils.

Career statistics

Regular season and playoffs

International

References

External links

1982 births
Living people
Alaska Aces (ECHL) players
Baie-Comeau Drakkar players
Belarusian ice hockey players
Canadian emigrants to Belarus
Canadian ice hockey left wingers
Cardiff Devils players
Edmonton Oilers players
Eisbären Berlin players
HC Dinamo Minsk players
HC Lugano players
KHL Medveščak Zagreb players
Las Vegas Wranglers players
Peoria Rivermen (AHL) players
Ice hockey people from Montreal
Springfield Falcons players
Tappara players
Torpedo Nizhny Novgorod players
Undrafted National Hockey League players
Utah Grizzlies (AHL) players
Canadian expatriate ice hockey players in the United States
Canadian expatriate ice hockey players in Wales
Canadian expatriate ice hockey players in Belarus
Canadian expatriate ice hockey players in Croatia
Canadian expatriate ice hockey players in Germany
Canadian expatriate ice hockey players in Russia
Canadian expatriate ice hockey players in Switzerland
Naturalized citizens of Belarus
Canadian expatriate ice hockey players in Finland